Rud-e Bozan (also Romanized as Rūd-e Bozān) is a village in Sakhvid Rural District, Nir District, Taft County, Yazd Province, Iran. At the 2006 census, its population was 33, in 12 families.

References 

Populated places in Taft County